Andrés Ramiro Escobar Díaz (born 14 May 1991), nicknamed Manga, is a Colombian footballer and convicted rapist who played as a forward, most recently for Leiknir Reykjavík.

Club career

Deportivo Cali
Escobar began his career in Categoría Primera A club, Deportivo Cali. He made his professional debut on 2 May 2010, in a 1–0 victory against Envigado, coming on as a 50th-minute substitute for Armando Carrillo. Escobar scored his first ever goal on 8 May, in the 38th minute in a 1–3 win against Deportivo Pereira. That same year he would score 5 goals in 6 matches in the 2010 Copa Colombia. He noticeably scored 2 goals in both legs of the final (1 goal per each match), in which Deportivo Cali defeated Itagüí with a global score of 3–0 therefore claiming the title.

Dynamo Kyiv
On 28 August 2011, it was announced that Ukrainian club Dynamo Kyiv purchased Escobar with an agreement of 5 years. Escobar officially debuted for the club on 21 September 2011, for the 2011–12 Ukrainian Cup, in a 3–2 away win against Kremin, coming on as a 73rd-minute substitute for Oleh Husyev. However, it is the only match that Escobar has played so far for the Ukrainian club.

Deportivo Cali
Escobar returned to Deportivo Cali for the 2012 season as a loan spell. Escobar scored 5 goals in 35 matches during the 2012 and 2013 season in Deportivo Cali. He made his way back to Dynamo Kyiv on 30 June 2013.

Évian
On 19 July, Escobar would be loaned to Ligue 1 club, Évian, club that would play the 2012–13 season.

FC Dallas
On 14 February 2014, Escobar officially signed for Major League Soccer side FC Dallas on loan from Dynamo Kyiv.

International career
Escobar was called for the Colombia U20 squad for the 2011 South American U-20 Championship. He played 8 of the 9 matches that the team played in the competition and scored 1 goal, in the 37th minute of the 2–1 win against Bolivia U20.

He also was called for the 2011 Toulon Tournament. There he played 4 matches, but did not scored any goal. Colombia was the champion of this tournament.

Career statistics

Club

International

International appearances

Under-20

International goals

Under-20

|}

Honours

Club
Deportivo Cali
Copa Colombia (1): 2010

Dynamo Kyiv
Premier League
Runner-up (1): 2011–12

International
Under-20
Toulon Tournament (1): 2011

Sexual abuse conviction 
In March of 2022, Escobar was convicted of raping a woman he met in Reykjavik. According to the court, Escobar took advantage of the woman's intoxicated state. In September 2022, Escobar received a two-and-a-half-year sentence.

References

External links

1991 births
Living people
Colombian footballers
Colombia youth international footballers
Colombian expatriate footballers
Association football forwards
Categoría Primera A players
Ligue 1 players
Major League Soccer players
USL Championship players
Championnat National 2 players
Argentine Primera División players
Designated Players (MLS)
Deportivo Cali footballers
FC Dynamo Kyiv players
Thonon Evian Grand Genève F.C. players
FC Dallas players
Atlético Nacional footballers
Millonarios F.C. players
CR Vasco da Gama players
Estudiantes de La Plata footballers
Deportes Tolima footballers
FK Liepāja players
Centro Sportivo Alagoano players
Cúcuta Deportivo footballers
Expatriate footballers in Ukraine
Colombian expatriate sportspeople in Ukraine
Expatriate footballers in France
Colombian expatriate sportspeople in France
Expatriate soccer players in the United States
Colombian expatriate sportspeople in the United States
Expatriate footballers in Brazil
Colombian expatriate sportspeople in Brazil
Expatriate footballers in Argentina
Colombian expatriate sportspeople in Argentina
Expatriate footballers in Latvia
Colombian expatriate sportspeople in Latvia
Sportspeople from Cauca Department